Louis Kent was an American poet.

Life

His work appeared in The New Yorker 
and Poetry Magazine.

He graduated from the University of Kansas, before working for the Department of Labor in Washington, D.C.

Award
 1949/1950 Shelley Memorial Award

Work

Review
In a review by Louise Townsend Nicholl, Kent received the following praise:
so far as I know, Louis Kent has never published another book of poems - which is too bad. Robert Hillyer, who was much interested in his work, brought him to me at Dutton's & I agreed on his "true lyrical genius", as Robert said. I had one few hours meeting with him & lunch - a tall young man, incisive & sincere & eager. Perhaps we will see his name again on a book someday. Louise Townsend Nicholl, 1956

References

Year of birth missing
Possibly living people
American male poets